Bothragonus occidentalis is a fish in the family Agonidae. It was described by Georgii Ustinovich Lindberg in 1935. It is a marine, temperate water-dwelling fish which is known from the northwestern Pacific Ocean, including Japan and Peter the Great Bay. It is known to dwell at a depth range of 0–100 metres. Males can reach a maximum total length of 7 centimetres.

References

occidentalis
Taxa named by Georgii Ustinovich Lindberg
Fish described in 1935